John Fitzgerald and Elizabeth Smylie were the defending champions but lost in the second round to Jim Pugh and Natasha Zvereva.

Cyril Suk and Larisa Neiland defeated Jacco Eltingh and Miriam Oremans in the final, 7–6(7–2), 6–2 to win the mixed doubles tennis title at the 1992 Wimbledon Championships.

Seeds

  Todd Woodbridge /  Jana Novotná (quarterfinals)
  Anders Järryd /  Helena Suková (third round)
  Cyril Suk /  Larisa Neiland (champions)
  Rick Leach /  Zina Garrison (second round)
  Kelly Jones /  Gigi Fernández (third round)
  Glenn Michibata /  Jill Hetherington (first round)
  Mark Woodforde /  Nicole Provis (third round)
  Tom Nijssen /  Manon Bollegraf (semifinals)
  John Fitzgerald /  Elizabeth Smylie (second round)
  David Macpherson /  Rachel McQuillan (first round)
  Grant Connell /  Kathy Rinaldi (second round)
  Mark Kratzmann /  Pam Shriver (second round)
  Todd Witsken /  Katrina Adams (first round)
  Steve DeVries /  Patty Fendick (first round)
  Laurie Warder /  Rennae Stubbs (third round)
  Scott Davis /  Robin White (first round)

Draw

Finals

Top half

Section 1

Section 2

Bottom half

Section 3

Section 4

References

External links

1992 Wimbledon Championships on WTAtennis.com
1992 Wimbledon Championships – Doubles draws and results at the International Tennis Federation

X=Mixed Doubles
Wimbledon Championship by year – Mixed doubles
Wimbledon Championships